John Charles Hodges (born 3 October 1937) is a former Australian  politician.  He was born in Brisbane, Queensland and was a pharmacist before entering the Parliament of Australia.  He was an alderman of City of Redcliffe from 1967 to 1976, and was deputy mayor from 1970 to 1976.

Hodges was the Liberal Party of Australia member for the House of Representatives seat of Petrie from the 1974 election until his defeat by Deane Wells at the 1983 election and from his defeat of Wells at the 1984 election until his defeat by Gary Johns at the 1987 election.  He was Minister for Immigration and Ethnic Affairs from May 1982 until the March 1983 election.

Notes

Liberal Party of Australia members of the Parliament of Australia
Members of the Australian House of Representatives for Petrie
Members of the Australian House of Representatives
1937 births
Living people
Politicians from Brisbane
Australian pharmacists
20th-century Australian politicians